Bright Antenna Records is an independent record label, founded in 2007 and based in Mill Valley, California. The label was created by producer Sep V and by writer Tiffanie DeBartolo and named after the lyrics to the song "The Spirit of Radio" by Rush. Bright Antenna specializes in artist development and, in addition to its label services, operates an online store for its vinyl and specialty products. BA's staff includes A&R veteran Braden Merrick, who discovered and broke The Killers.

Roster
As of June 2021, Bright Antenna's roster of artists includes:
 Beware of Darkness
 Cheerleader
 Cloud Castle Lake
 Dan The Man (of The Wombats)
 Fana Hues
 Flagship
 In The Valley Below
 Kyle Nicolaides
 Love Thy Brother
 Margolnick
 Mona
PREP
 Roman Lewis
 Sports Team
 Wilderado
 The Wombats

Past Artists
Far
Jimmy Gnecco (of Ours)
Magic Wands
Middle Class Rut
Orchestral Manoeuvres in the Dark (OMD)
Paul Hartnoll (of Orbital)
Robert Smith (of The Cure)
Reuben Hollebon
Spring Tigers
The Catholic Comb
Zack Lopez (of Middle Class Rut)

Discography
 Beware of Darkness – Howl EP (2012)
Beware Of Darkness – Howl (single) (2013)
 Beware of Darkness – Orthodox (2013)
 Beware of Darkness – Sanctuary Season (2015)
Beware Of Darkness –  Dope (single) (2016)
Beware Of Darkness – Muthafucka (single) (2016)
Beware Of Darkness – Are You Real? (single) (2016)
 Beware of Darkness – Are You Real? (2016)
Beware Of Darkness – Summer Daze (single) (2017)
 The Catholic Comb – The Catholic Comb EP (2008)
 The Catholic Comb – Vampire Life (2008)
 Cheerleader – Perfect Vision/Waiting Waiting (2014)
 Cheerleader – On Your Side (2014)
 Cheerleader – The Sunshine of Your Youth (2015)
Cheerleader – Bang, Bang (single) (2019)
Cloud Castle Lake – Twins (single)  (2017)
Cloud Castle Lake – Bonfire (single) (2017)
Cloud Castle Lake – Malingerer (single) (2018)
Cloud Castle Lake – Genuflect (single) (2018)
Cloud Castle Lake – Malingerer (2018)
Cloud Castle Lake – The Meeting (Original Motion Picture Soundtrack) (2018)
Dan The Man – Something Good (single) (2017)
Dan The Man – Circadian Circus (2017)
Fana Hues – Hues (2020)
 Far – Pony (2009)
 Flagship – blackbush EP (2012)
Flagship – Break The Sky (single) (2013)
 Flagship – Flagship (2013)
Flagship – Are You Calling (single) (2014)
Flagship – I Want You (single) (2015)
 Flagship – Faded EP (2015)
Flagship – You Shook Me All Night Long (single) (2017)
Flagship – Midnight (single) (2017)
Flagship – The Electric Man (2017)
Flagship – Philadelphia Babe (single) (2018)
Flagship – The Ladder (EP) (2018)
In The Valley Below – Bloodhands (Oh My Fever) (single) (2017)    
In The Valley Below – Elephant EP (2017)
In The Valley Below – Desperate Dance (single) (2018)
In The Valley Below – Rise (single) (2019)
In The Valley Below – Blue Sky Drugs (single) (2019)
In The Valley Below – The Pink Chateau (2019)
 Jimmy Gnecco – Bring You Home (2010)
 Jimmy Gnecco – The Heart (2010)
 Jimmy Gnecco – The Heart X Edition (2011)
Kyle Nicolaides – American Hymns (single) (2018)
Kyle Nicolaides – American Hymns (acoustic) (single) (2018)
Kyle Nicolaides – Space Between Us (single) (2018)
Kyle Nicolaides – Now Or Nowhere Vol. 1 (2018)
Love Thy Brother – Love Me Better (feat. Ariel Beesley) (single) (2016)
Love Thy Brother – Arrested (feat. Norma Jean Martine) (single) (2018)
 Magic Wands – Magic Love & Dreams (2009)
Magic Wands – Teenage Love (Single) (2012)
Magic Wands  – Space (Single) (2012)
Magic Wands  – Black Magic (Single) (2012)
Magic Wands – Aloha Moon (2012)
Magic Wands  – Space 19 (single) (2019)
Magic Wands  – Kaleidoscope Hearts 19 (single) (2019)
Magic Wands  – Black Magic 19 (single) (2019)
 Magic Wands – Aloha Moon 19 (2019)
 Middle Class Rut – 25 Years (2009)
 Middle Class Rut – All Walks of Life/Busy Bein' Born (2008)
 Middle Class Rut – Busy Bein' Born/Start to Run (2009)
Middle Class Rut – New Low (single) (2010)    
 Middle Class Rut – No Name No Color (2010)
Middle Class Rut – Hurricane (2011)
Middle Class Rut – Aunt Betty (single) (2013)
 Middle Class Rut – Pick Up Your Head (2013)
 Middle Class Rut – Factories/Indians (2014)
Mona – In The Middle (2017)
Mona  – Kiss Like A Woman (single) (2018)
Mona  – Not Alone (single) (2018)
Mona  – Thought Provoked (single) (2018)
Mona – Soldier On (2018)
Mona  – Better Now (single) (2018)
Mona – Goons (single) (2019)
Orchestral Manoeuvres In The Dark  – Save Me (single) (2010)
Orchestral Manoeuvres In The Dark  – If You Want It (single) (2010)
 Orchestral Manoeuvres In The Dark – History of Modern (2010)
 Orchestral Manoeuvres In The Dark – If You Want It (2010)
 Orchestral Manoeuvres In The Dark – Sister Marie Says (2010)
Orchestral Manoeuvres In The Dark – History of Modern (part I) (2011)
Orchestral Manoeuvres In The Dark  –  Live In Berlin (2011)
 Paul Hartnoll feat. Robert Smith – Please (2007)
PREP – PREP (2020)
Reuben Hollebon  –  Faces (single) (2015)
Reuben Hollebon  –  Haystacks (single) (2015)
 Reuben Hollebon – Terminal Nostalgia (2015)
Reuben Hollebon – On & On (single) (2016)
Reuben Hollebon – On & On EP
Roman Lewis   –  Mindless Town (single) (2018)
Roman Lewis   –  Midnight in Paris (single) (2018)
Roman Lewis   –  Rose (single) (2018)
Roman Lewis   –  Ways (single) (2018)
Roman Lewis   –  Heartbreak (for now) (2019)
Sports Team    –   Here It Comes Again (single) (2019)
Sports Team    –  M5 (single) (2019)
Spring Tigers – Spring Tigers (2009)
The Catholic Comb  –  The Catholic Comb – EP (2009)
 The Wombats – 1996 (single) (2011)
 The Wombats – Anti–D (single) (2011)
 The Wombats – Jump Into the Fog (single) (2011)
 The Wombats – Our Perfect Disease (single) (2011)
 The Wombats – Techno Fan (single) (2011)
 The Wombats – Tokyo (Vampires & Wolves) (single) (2010)
 The Wombats – The Wombats (2008)
 The Wombats – The Wombats Proudly Present: This Modern Glitch (2011)
 The Wombats – Your Body Is a Weapon (single) (2013)
 The Wombats – Glitterbug (2015)
The Wombats – Beautiful People Will Ruin Your Life (2018)
Various Artists  –  Bright Antenna Record Store Day Compilation (2015)
Wilderado  –  Sorrow (single) (2018)
Wilderado  –  You Don't Love Me (single) (2018)
Wilderado – Favors (2018)
Wilderado – Favors (Acoustic) (2018)
Wilderado – Surefire (2019)
Wilderado – Surefire (Piano) (2020)
Wilderado – CFS (2020)
Wilderado – Revenant (2020)
Wilderado – Take Some Time (2020)
Wilderado – Head Right (2021)
Zack Lopez  –  I Don't Know (single) (2016)
Zack Lopez  –  Bonzo Rathet (single) (2016)
 Zack Lopez – Bloodlines (2016)
Zack Lopez – Life On The Run (2016)

References

External links

American independent record labels
Record labels established in 2007